Charles Keating Tuckerman (March 11, 1827 – February 26, 1896) was an American diplomat, author and the first American minister resident to Greece.

Early life and family 
Charles Keating Tuckerman was born on March 11, 1827, in Boston, Massachusetts, to Henry Harris Tuckerman (1783–1860) and Ruth Lyman Keating (1787–1823). His parents had the following children: Elizabeth Tuckerman Heath (d. 1847), Henry Theodore Tuckerman, Lucy Keating Tuckerman (1820–1880), Ruth Keating Tuckerman (1821–1896), and Charles Keating Tuckerman (1821–1896). His sister Ruth married Rudolph Bunner, Jr. (1813–1875), the son of Rudolph Bunner (1779–1837), a U.S. Representative from New York. He was educated at Boston Latin School.

His first cousins included Edward Tuckerman (1817–1886), the botanist, Samuel Parkman Tuckerman (1819–1890), the composer, and Frederick Goddard Tuckerman (1821–1873), the poet.

Career
After spending his 20s working overseas, he returned to the United States in 1856, settling in New York City, where he directed the New York Institution for the Blind.

President Andrew Johnson asked Tuckerman in 1867 to be the American minister resident to Greece, because of Tuckerman's experience overseas. The Senate refused initially to confirm Tuckerman's nomination, but he was officially appointed on March 11, 1868, and presented his credentials on June 16, 1868.  Tuckerman was the first American diplomat ever posted to Greece. While there, he helped improve trading relations between Greece and the United States. His resignation in 1871 was delayed for six months by President Ulysses S. Grant, who wanted to keep Tuckerman on the job and presented recall on November 4, 1871.  Tuckerman returned to the United States after his Greek posting.

Writings 
Tuckerman wrote three books:
 The Greeks of To-day (published in 1872 by G.P. Putnam & Sons)
 Miscellaneous Poems (published in 1880 by Moxon, Saunders and Co.)
 Personal Recollections of Notable People at Home and Abroad (published in 1895 in two volumes by Dodd Mead)

Personal life
In 1858, Tuckerman married Mary Fleming (1837–1901). Together they had:
Arthur Lyman Tuckerman (1861–1892), an architect who wrote three books: A Short History of Architecture (1887), Design (1891), and Selections of Works of Architecture and Sculpture Belonging Chiefly to the Period of the Renaissance in Italy (1891).
Tuckerman died in Florence, Italy on February 26, 1896.

References

External links
Google Books version of the 1910 National Cyclopaedia of American Biography
"Political characteristics of the modern Greeks," an article written by Charles Tuckerman for Harper's Magazine in 1872.
Design by Arthur Lyman Tuckerman, digitized by Internet Archive

19th-century American diplomats
19th-century American male writers
1827 births
1896 deaths
Ambassadors of the United States to Greece
19th-century American poets
19th-century American non-fiction writers
American male poets
American male non-fiction writers
Boston Latin School alumni